Vesa-Matti "Vesku" Loiri (4 January 1945 – 10 August 2022) was a Finnish actor, musician and comedian, best known for his role as Uuno Turhapuro, whom he portrayed in a total of 20 movies between the years 1973 and 2004.

According to Yle News, ″Loiri was one of Finland's most beloved cultural figures over six decades, playing comic and tragic roles on screen and stage, alongside a musical career″.

Life and career

Loiri was born in Helsinki on 4 January 1945 to Taito Loiri (1911–1995) and Lily Nylund (1916–2013), and the family moved to North Haaga when Loiri was a child. Loiri became an actor in 1962, when he had a role in the movie Pojat, directed by Mikko Niskanen, and graduated from the Finnish Theatre Academy, now the Uniarts Helsinki  theatre academy, in 1966. Loiri did his most recognised work with comedian-director-producer Spede Pasanen, starting from Noin seitsemän veljestä. Spede and Loiri also developed his highly popular Uuno Turhapuro persona which would star in one of Finland's longest and most commercially successful film-series. In 2005, he starred in the film Shadow of the Eagle, which was directed by Timo Koivusalo. Six films starring Loiri are in the top 20 list of the highest-grossing domestic films in Finland. Total number of tickets sold to the screenings of these six films is 3,715,948.

As a musician, Loiri performed compositions of Perttu Hietanen and Taisto Wesslin, Eino Leino's poems, Carl Michael Bellman's drinking songs and Juha "Watt" Vainio's songs. Loiri also played the flute, a talent he put to use representing Finland at the Eurovision Song Contest 1980 in The Hague/Netherlands with the song "Huilumies", dedicated to his flute. He finished last in a field of 19 participating countries. During his career, Loiri sold over 730,000 certified records in Finland and is currently the fifth-best-selling soloist and ninth-best-selling artist of all time in the country. He was the voice of the Genie in the Finnish dub of Disney's Aladdin, even performing the musical numbers Friend Like Me and Prince Ali. When dubbing the Genie, Loiri did not see the original Robin Williams version and was only given a slight idea of what the original gags and jokes were. Disney gave the team an award for the best foreign Aladdin dub.

Loiri appeared in the premiere of Aulis Sallinen's opera Kullervo in Los Angeles in 1992, creating the role of the blind singer.

Loiri also had a lifelong interest and exceptional talent in a number of sports, especially association football. It has been said that, had he not chosen to concentrate on acting, he could have become a national professional-level goalkeeper. He was signed by juggernauts HJK for one season in 1972. He held the office of Chairman of the Finnish billiards association for multiple years, being an especially gifted billiards player.

On 10 August 2022 Loiri died from cancer, at the age of 77.

Awards
 Honorary Jussi Award 1963 for his role in the film Pojat
 Best male actor Jussi 1976 in Rakastunut rampa
 Best supporting male actor Jussi 1982 in Pedon merkki
 Jussi 1983 for his wide appearance in the year's films
 Concrete Jussi 1998
 Festival International du Film Indépendant awarded Loiri in Brussels in 2003 for his role in Pahat pojat
 Best Actor Telvis in 1984, 1986 and 1987
 Special Telvis in 1999
 Special Venla in 1989
 Black Nights Film Festival awarded Loiri in Tallinn for A Lifetime Achievement Award in 2010

Discography

Albums

Compilations

Singles
2008: "Sydämeeni joulun teen" (reached No. 14 in the Finnish Singles Chart)
2009: "Hyvää puuta" (reached No. 19 in the Finnish Singles Chart)

Filmography

 A Spice for Life (2019)
 Elämältä kaiken sain (2015)
 Road North (2012)
 The Storage (2011)
 Shadow of the Eagle (2005)
 Uuno Turhapuro – This Is My Life (2004)
 Bad Boys (2003)
 Rumble (2002)
 Hurmaava joukkoitsemurha (2000)
 Talossa on Saatana (1999)
 History Is Made at Night (1999)
 Sokkotanssi (1999)
 Johtaja Uuno Turhapuro – pisnismies (1998)
 Kummeli: Kultakuume (1997)
 Ruuvimies (1995)
 Kesäyön unelma (1994)
 Vääpeli Körmy – Taisteluni (1994)
 Uuno Turhapuron poika (1993)
 Ripa ruostuu (1993)
 Kuka on Joe Louis? (1992)
 Uuno Turhapuro, Suomen tasavallan herra presidentti (1992)
 Vääpeli Körmy ja vetenalaiset vehkeet (1991)
 Uuno Turhapuro, herra Helsingin herra (1991)
 Uunon huikeat poikamiesvuodet maaseudulla (1990)
 Tupla-Uuno (1988)
 Uuno Turhapuro – kaksoisagentti (1987)
 Älä itke Iines (1987)
 Pikkupojat (1986)
 Liian iso keikka (1986)
 Uuno Turhapuro muuttaa maalle (1986)
 Uuno Epsanjassa (1985)
 Hei kliffaa hei! (1985)
 Kepissä on kaksi päätä (1985)
 Uuno Turhapuro armeijan leivissä (1984)

 Lentävät luupäät (1984)
 Uuno Turhapuron muisti palailee pätkittäin (1983)
 Jon (1983)
 Ulvova mylläri (1982)
 Uuno Turhapuro menettää muistinsa (1982)
 Uuno Turhapuron aviokriisi (1981)
 Pedon merkki (1981)
 Tup-akka-lakko (1980)
 Koeputkiaikuinen ja Simon enkelit (1979)
 Rautakauppias Uuno Turhapuro, presidentin vävy (1978)
 Häpy Endkö? Eli kuinka Uuno Turhapuro sai niin kauniin ja rikkaan vaimon (1977)
 Tykkimies Kauppalan viimeiset vaiheet (1977)
 Lottovoittaja UKK Turhapuro (1976)
 Seitsemän veljestä (1976)
 Rakastunut rampa (1975)
 Professori Uuno D.G. Turhapuro (1975)
 Robin Hood ja hänen iloiset vekkulinsa Sherwoodin pusikoissa (1974)
 Uuno Turhapuro (1973)
 Lasinen eläintarha (1973)
 Hellyys (1972)
 Hirttämättömät (1971)
 Kahdeksas veljes (1971)
 Jussi Pussi (1970)
 Pohjan tähteet (1969)
 Leikkikalugangsteri (1969)
 Näköradiomiehen ihmeelliset siekailut (1969)
 Oma (1969)
 Noin seitsemän veljestä (1968)
 Luule kanssamme (1968)
 Lapualaismorsian (1967)
 Pojat (1962)

See also
List of best-selling music artists in Finland
Nasse-setä

References

External links

Vesa-Matti Loiri's career (in English)

1945 births
2022 deaths
Deaths from cancer in Finland
Male actors from Helsinki
Eurovision Song Contest entrants of 1980
Finnish male voice actors
Eurovision Song Contest entrants for Finland
20th-century Finnish male singers
Spede Pasanen
Finnish flautists
Finnish pool players
Finnish male boxers
People convicted of assault
20th-century Finnish male actors
21st-century Finnish male singers
21st-century Finnish male actors
20th-century flautists
21st-century flautists